Òran Mór 2020 (stylized in all caps, also written Oran Mor 2020) is a live concert album by Scottish indie rock band The Twilight Sad, released as a "pay-what-you-want" download via Bandcamp by Rock Action Records on 26 December 2020. It features only vocalist James Graham and guitarist Andy MacFarlane, together with some programmed drums.

Background
The album is the soundtrack to a live concert video recorded in October 2020 at Glasgow venue Òran Mór, which was shown as a paid stream on 5 December 2020, and was only available for viewing on that day. It features eleven tracks taken from all five of the band's studio albums, along with a cover of The Cure's "M". On 25 December, in a Twitter post wishing a Merry Christmas, the band said that they "also hear that sometimes the best presents arrive on the 26th". The following day, they announced that the concert video would be available to purchase again for three days (free to previous ticket holders), and also that the soundtrack would be released that day. It is titled to distinguish it from their previous acoustic Òran Mór Session, recorded at the same venue in 2015.

Track listing

Personnel
Musicians
James Alexander Graham – vocals
Andy MacFarlane – guitars, programming

Production
Andy MacFarlane – producer
Michael Brennan – mixing

Release history

References

2020 albums
The Twilight Sad albums
Rock Action Records albums